Joshua Dodd (born 24 February 1996) is a South African cricketer. He made his List A debut for Border in the 2018–19 CSA Provincial One-Day Challenge on 4 November 2018. He made his first-class debut for Border in the 2018–19 CSA 3-Day Provincial Cup on 31 January 2019. He made his Twenty20 debut for Border in the 2019–20 CSA Provincial T20 Cup on 13 September 2019.

References

External links
 

1996 births
Living people
South African cricketers
Border cricketers
Place of birth missing (living people)